Rhododendron adenosum (枯鲁杜鹃) is a rhododendron species native to southwestern Sichuan, China, where it grows at altitudes of 3300–3600 meters. It is a shrub that typically grows to 4 meters in height, with leaves that are ovate to lanceolate or elliptic, and 7–10.5 × 2.4–3.4 cm in size. Flowers are pale pink with purple flecks.

References
 (Cowan & Davidian) Davidian, Quart. Bull. Amer. Rhododendron Soc. 32: 81. 1978.
 World Flora Online

adenosum